This is a list of shopping malls in Latvia

Malls in Latvia

As of 2019, Latvia had at least 20 malls.

References

External links
Shopping centers in Latvia 2017

Latvia
Shopping malls
Shopping malls